Néo kýma (translated as "new wave") is a Greek music genre appeared during so called Greek New Wave movement in the mid-1960s which lasted about a decade. It was a mixture of entechno and French chansons; it was so named by Giannis Spanos after the French Nouvelle Vague. Most of the Greek New Wave artists released their songs in the Greek label LYRA.

Notable artists 
Notable Greek artists from the Neo Kyma movement include:

Arleta
Keti Chomata
Kostas Hatzis
Mariza Koch
Rena Koumioti
Notis Mauvroudes
Lakis Pappas
Giannis Poulopoulos
Dionysis Savvopoulos
Giannis Spanos
Mihalis Violaris
Giorgos Zographos
Lefki Symphonia
popi Asteriadi

See also 
 Rebetiko
 Laiko
 Greek Punk

References

External links 
 Contemporary Greece 1945-2000, Foundation of the Hellenic World

1960s establishments in Greece
20th-century music genres
Greek styles of music

fr:Musique grecque#Musique populaire